The Sweden–Israel Friendship Association is a Sweden-based organization which describes its purpose as to "establish and increase knowledge about – and the understanding of – Israel in Sweden, and in different ways work to strengthen Swedish–Israeli bonds of friendship."

The Sweden–Israel Friendship Association established its first local branch in Stockholm in 1953. The founding was marked with an appeal written by Hugo Valentin, Swedish historian, in the Riksdag building on May 8. In 1954 local branches were also established in Gothenburg and Malmö. The nationwide association was established in 1978.

The association currently comprises 26 local branches with about 3,000 members. The current chairman of the association is Lars Adaktusson — member of the Riksdag for the Christian Democrats.

See also 
 Foreign relations of Israel
 Foreign relations of Sweden
 International recognition of Israel
 Israel–Sweden relations

References

External links 
 Official website

1953 establishments in Sweden
Political organizations based in Sweden
Israel friendship associations
Jews and Judaism in Sweden
Israel–Sweden relations
Sweden friendship associations
Organizations established in 1953
Jewish Swedish history